Eric G. Fraser (7 January 1931 – 6 July 2000) was an English World Cup winning professional rugby league footballer who played in the 1950s and 1960s. He played at representative level has played for Great Britain (captain), and at club level for Warrington (captain), as a goal-kicking , i.e. number 1.

Playing career
Fraser won caps for Great Britain while at Warrington in 1958 against Australia (3 matches), and New Zealand (2 matches), in 1959 against France (2 matches), and Australia, in 1960 against France (2 matches), New Zealand, and France (2 matches), and in 1961 against France, and New Zealand (2 matches). He played , and scored a goal in Warrington's 5-4 victory over St. Helens in the 1959–60 Lancashire County Cup Final during the 1959–60 season at Central Park, Wigan on Saturday 31 October 1959. Fraser played  in the first two of the three matches for Great Britain's 1960 Rugby League World Cup winning team, being replaced by Austin Rhodes in the last game against Australia.

Fraser was inducted to the Warrington Wolves Hall of Fame.

References

External links
!Great Britain Statistics at englandrl.co.uk (statistics currently missing due to not having appeared for both Great Britain, and England)
(archived by web.archive.org) Wire legend makes his début
Warrington’s World Cup heroes – Eric Fraser
Statistics at wolvesplayers.thisiswarrington.co.uk

1931 births
2000 deaths
English rugby league players
Great Britain national rugby league team captains
Great Britain national rugby league team players
Rugby league fullbacks
Rugby league players from St Helens, Merseyside
Warrington Wolves captains
Warrington Wolves players